Ayalah Deborah Bentovim (born 30 December 1970), better known by her stage name Sister Bliss, is a British keyboardist, record producer, DJ and songwriter. In the studio, she is best known for her work with Rollo Armstrong as one half of the production duo Rollo & Sister Bliss, and particularly as part of Faithless.

Career

Faithless
Sister Bliss formed Faithless in 1995 with Rollo, Jamie Catto and Maxi Jazz. Bliss constructed most of the music of Faithless herself electronically, but also played the piano, violin, saxophone and bass guitar. Various others have been members and collaborators over the years including Zoë Johnston and, frequently, Rollo's sister Dido, who began her musical career providing backing vocals on Rollo's 1994 single 'Give Me Life' (under the pseudonym Mr V). Faithless toured extensively, and while Rollo preferred to stay in the studio, Sister Bliss could be seen on stage with Maxi Jazz. Faithless enjoyed a 17-year career that included 7 albums, including two number ones, and six top 10 singles. To date, Faithless have sold in excess of 15 million records worldwide and have played live to millions across the world.

In 1996, she teamed up with Faithless bandmate Rollo to successfully remix Moby's recording of "That's When I Reach for My Revolver". Moby was so pleased they were asked to remix another song – "Honey". Sister Bliss would sometimes use glue to disable unneeded keys on their synths during live performances, although this may have been done ironically.

She released a two-disc compilation entitled Headliners: 02 in 2001.

On 10 September 2006, she gave birth to a son named Nate. The track "Nate's Tune" found on the Faithless album To All New Arrivals is dedicated to him. Later on, Faithless founded their own record label called Nate's Tunes.

She released Nightmoves on 14 July 2008.

Post-Faithless
Following Faithless' retirement from touring in April 2011, she has concentrated on different projects. She presents a weekly show on Ministry of Sound Radio at 7 pm on Friday evenings.

Sister Bliss has collaborated with Dido, Boy George, Cat Power, Robert Smith (The Cure), The Temper Trap and Example amongst others. A gifted musician and composer, Sister Bliss has written music for film, TV and theatre. Credits include 2012ʼs film Knife Fight starring Rob Lowe, and directed by 2-times Oscar winner, Bill Guttentag, commissions for Sex and the City 2, Danny Boyleʼs The Beach, acclaimed British film The Hide, Crossing The Line and popular TV drama Life Begins. For theatre, Bliss has written music for The Black Album and The Emperor Jones at The National Theatre in London, as well as composing an original piece for the London Sinfonietta, which was performed at Fuse Festival, UK.

The Faithless Sound System – a stripped down live act featuring a live PA from Maxi Jazz, DJ set from Bliss and percussion – has appeared at a number of festivals worldwide since the full Faithless band's split. The sets are typically one hour or less in duration.

She has occasionally appeared at medium-sized clubs in the UK in recent years, often as a headline DJ act playing sets of house music.

Junkdog Records is her current record label, launched in 2013. Junkdog has released Sister Bliss solo singles, her remixing of others' tracks and also independent artists.

On 31 May 2013, she reunited with Maxi Jazz for a Faithless live PA and DJ set at the Electric Brixton nightclub in London. The 1,500 capacity event was in aid of the youth academy for Crystal Palace football club. A similar arrangement of her DJing house tracks between Faithless songs featuring Maxi Jazz on live vocals, was performed at a festival in the United States in March of the same year. The Brixton Electric gig was repeated on 6 June 2014 and was described as an "annual fundraiser", indicating that it will continue to be a once-yearly event.

She released the mid-tempo house track "Dancing Home" under the name of Bliss in 2014. Featuring Dutch vocalist Janne Schra, it was remixed by Tuff City Kids and Yoon.

Discography

Albums 
 Headliners: 02 (2001)
 Nightmoves (2008)

Singles

References

External links
 

English electronic musicians
English keyboardists
English record producers
English songwriters
British women record producers
DJs from London
Club DJs
Remixers
Jewish British musicians
English Ashkenazi Jews
Living people
1971 births
English women DJs
Alumni of the University of Birmingham
English women in electronic music
21st-century English women musicians
Electronic dance music DJs